Glenn Allen Love Jr. (born June 8, 1989) is an American football linebacker who is currently a free agent. He played college football at the University of California, Los Angeles and attended Hamilton High School in Chandler, Arizona. He has also been a member of the BC Lions and Montreal Alouettes.

Early years
Love played high school football for the Hamilton High School Huskies. He was named first-team all-state and all-region in 2006 after recording more than 100 tackles and a school-record 10 interceptions. He also lettered in soccer, basketball, and track.

College career
Love played for the UCLA Bruins from 2008 to 2011. He did not see action in 2007 due to injuries.

Professional career
Love signed with the CFL's BC Lions on June 24, 2012. He made his CFL debut on August 6, 2012 against the Toronto Argonauts. He was released by the Lions on June 23, 2013. Love was signed by the Calgary Stampeders of the CFL on August 28, 2013. He was named CFL Special Teams Player of the Week for Week 19 of the 2014 CFL season.

References

External links

Just Sports Stats
College stats
Calgary Stampeders bio

Living people
1989 births
Players of American football from Illinois
American football linebackers
Canadian football linebackers
African-American players of American football
African-American players of Canadian football
UCLA Bruins football players
BC Lions players
Calgary Stampeders players
Sportspeople from Champaign, Illinois
Saskatchewan Roughriders players
Montreal Alouettes players
21st-century African-American sportspeople
20th-century African-American people